Kirkby is a town in the Metropolitan Borough of Knowsley, Merseyside, England. The population in 2016 was 41,495 making it the largest in Knowsley and the 9th biggest settlement in Merseyside.

Evidence of Bronze Age activity has been noted though the first direct evidence of a settlement dates to 1086 via the Doomsday Book. The town was mainly farmland until the mid-20th century due to building of ROF Kirkby, the largest Royal Ordanance Factory filling munitions.

In November 2020, Liverpool F.C. relocated its training facilities from the Melwood site in West Derby, to the town following the completion of the new AXA Training Centre.

History

It is believed that Kirkby was founded around 870 AD, due to archaeological evidence of Bronze Age settlement.
Historically, it has been part of Lancashire. Kirk-by derives from the Northern dialect of Old English word Kirk ('church') and by (settlement or village; cognate with Old Norse byr). Settlers arrived via Ireland around 900. The first direct evidence of a settlement dates from 1086 and the Domesday Book, with a reference to "Cherchebi" (population 70). Ownership of present-day Kirkby (established as the West Derby hundred in the 11th century) passed through a number of hands until 1596, when the Molyneux family purchased the hundred. After a brief loss of patronage in 1737 (when the head of the family took holy orders), in 1771 the Molyneux family were made Earls of Sefton and regained their lands.

Although it remained largely farmland until the mid-20th century, transport links to the region began in 1848 with the building of the Liverpool and Bury Railway through Kirkby. The East Lancashire Road (the A580) added a road connection in 1935, and industrial development was considered before the Second World War. ROF Kirkby, a Royal Ordnance Factory, was established in 1939 and completed in 1941. At its peak, the factory employed over 20,000 workers.

Liverpool had received much damage by the end of the war, and much of its remaining housing stock were slums. The Liverpool Corporation began a policy of buying land in surrounding areas and moving industry (and people) to newly-developed "over-spill" estates. Kirkby became Merseyside's largest over-spill estates. A 1949 Liverpool proposal to have Kirkby designated a new town was rejected. Large-scale development began in February 1950 with the construction of the Southdene neighbourhood; the first houses were finished in 1952, the 5,000th in 1956, and the 10,000th in 1961. A population of 3,000 in 1951 grew to over 52,000 by 1961. The Kirkby Urban District was created in 1958. Its population grew between the 1950s and the 1970s due to over-spill housing for Liverpool.

Growth caused a number of problems, including a lack of local amenities. Although occupation of Southdene's council estates had begun in 1952, its first shops were not completed until 1955 and its first pub did not open until 1959. The people who were being moved into Kirkby during this period came from Liverpool's poorest areas. Kirkby Industrial Estate expanded to become one of England's largest; at its peak in 1971, the estate employed over 26,000 people.

Kirkby became an Urban District in 1958. This status was later abolished, and on 1 April 1974 Kirkby was combined with Huyton with Roby and Prescot Urban Districta and parts of Whiston and West Lancashire Rural Districts to form the Metropolitan Borough of Knowsley.

Government

Kirkby has been represented in Parliament by George Howarth since 1986. First as part of the Knowsley North constituency, then as part of the Knowsley North and Sefton East constituency, and as part of the Knowsley constituency since 2010. Howarth holds a 42,214-vote majority, making his seat the second safest Labour Party seat. He was preceded by Robert Kilroy-Silk (Labour, 1974–1986), Harold Soref (Conservative, 1970–1974) and Harold Wilson (Labour, 1950–1970).

Kirkby is divided into four districts: Southdene, Westvale, Northwood and Tower Hill. Its electoral wards, which do not coincide with the districts, are Cherryfield, Kirkby Central, Northwood, Park, Shevington and Whitefield. Kirkby's 18 local councillors belong to the Labour Party, and often run unopposed.

Geography
The River Alt flows through the town's extreme south-west, with the Kirkby Brook tributary passing through its centre.

Climate
Due to its position near England's north-west coast, Kirkby has a temperate maritime climate; its Köppen climate classification is Cfb. The annual average sunshine duration, 1394.6 hours, is slightly higher than the UK average of 1339.7. The nearest Met Office weather station is at Manchester Airport.

Demographics
Kirkby's population was 42,744 in the 2011 census. This was just over a quarter of the total population of the borough of Knowsley and was down from its peak of 52,207 in the 1961 census, largely due to a falling birth rate and the slow decline of the industrial estate. Housing demand has increased, however, with significant developments built across the town. Part of the demand may be attributed to a need for replacement housing stock due to the demolition of high-rise flats and maisonettes, built during the 1960s and now in disrepair.

According to British government statistics, the borough of Knowsley (including Kirkby) had a population of 145,900 in the 2011 census and a gender balance of 52.6 percent female to 47.4 percent male. This is down from 150,459 in the 2001 census. The borough has a white population of 98.42 percent, compared with the national average of 90.9 percent. Other ethnic groups are multiracial (0.83 percent), Chinese (0.24 percent), other Asian (0.23 percent) and Black (0.22 percent). A large proportion of the population is of Irish Catholic descent as a result of immigration into Liverpool.

The borough is mostly Christian (85.63 percent), compared to the national average of 71.74 percent. The next-largest group (5.84 percent) describe themselves as non-religious, significantly lower than the national average of 14.59 percent. Muslims, Hindus, Buddhists and Jews are 0.17, 0.11, 0.07 and 0.03 percent of the population.

Population changes

Kirkby's population was on a gradual downward trend from 1861 to 1931 before it rose when the Liverpool Corporation began to develop the region. Its annual growth rate from 1951 to 1961 was over 30 percent, making it England's fastest-growing town by far. Kirkby's population peaked in 1971 at 59,917, before declining. The town's population has again begun to increase.

Economy

Kirkby Industrial Estate, formerly ROF Kirkby, is still a large employer. The town's industrial heritage, however, has largely faded away as service industries replace factories. Major employers include QVC and Barclaycard, and several call centre companies are based in Kirkby.

Regeneration

Kirkby has seen considerable regeneration efforts in recent years. The Kirkby Sports Centre, one of the region's main velodromes and athletic centres, was replaced in 2007 by a leisure facility without a track. Several new stores have opened after Kirkby had been without a major supermarket for nearly 40 years.

The regeneration began in December 2006, when a proposal was made by Tesco and Everton F.C. for redevelopment of the town centre which included a 50,000-seat football stadium and retail outlets. Kirkby Market was redeveloped, and reopened on 26 April 2014.

In 2015, the town centre owned by Tesco was bought by St. Modwen Properties for £35.8 million. St Modwen announced their plans for the regeneration of the town centre, including a cinema, a supermarket, parking, and leisure development. This led to reports that two supermarkets were competing to build a store; it was rumoured that one of the stores was ASDA who were the last major supermarket located in Kirkby, closing in the late 1970's. A public hearing was held for local businesses, shopkeepers and residents in October 2016. St, Modwen submitted a revised application for the town-centre scheme to include food-store anchor Morrisons, who submitted the winning bid.

Tesco plans
Knowsley Borough Council hosted public consultation events about possible redevelopment options in summer 2007, which indicated most respondents had reservations about the proposed football ground. A majority of people supported regeneration in general, but not the plan which included the building of the new Everton stadium. Reports suggest local support for the Tesco/Everton F.C. scheme was tempered by concern over the effect the stadium will have on residents.

The Tesco Plans were a point of contention in the May 2008 local government election and a newly formed political party to fight the plans was formed known as 1st 4 Kirkby which missed out on gaining a council seat by 16 votes. At the original planning committee, four Lib-Dem councillors voted in favour of the proposals and the majority Labour Party candidates in the town general supported the development. Ultimately the Secretary of State rejected the application outright on 26 November 2009 and so ended what was known as "Destination Kirkby".

In 2012, the Knowsley council decided to invest £5 million to replace the multi-purpose Kirkby Civic Suite with the Kirkby Centre. The centre would include a library, a gallery and a local-history archive.

St. Modwen plans
After the collapse of Tesco's plans for Kirkby Town Centre, regeneration halted until St. Modwen Properties acquired the town centre in October 2015. St. Modwen planned a multi-million-pound retail-led regeneration in partnership with Knowsley Metropolitan Borough Council. They planned to develop and expand the retail centre, complementing Tesco's existing offer and providing housing on a 65-acre site the town centre. Refurbishment began in June 2016, and was planned to take eight weeks. In October, St. Modwen announced 24 November as the date for Kirkby's Christmas lights switch-on. X Factor finalists Reggie 'n' Bollie officially turned on the lights, ahead of a month of celebrations in Kirkby Town Centre; the music duo was joined by boy band District 12, pop act S Club Party and girl group Tiger S.

In November 2016, Reel Cinemas agreed a deal with St Modwen to operate a 15,000sq ft, six screen Cinema in the town centre on the site of the old library. Costa Coffee agreed in February 2017 to open a store in the town centre. In September, St. Modwen confirmed that Morrisons would open a 45,000-square-foot supermarket in the town centre. This was predicted to create around 200 jobs in the town as well as a 450-space car park. The following month, St. Modwen held an information event with the community about their proposed plans. According to the company, work would begin in 2018 and end in 2019. The planning application was granted in November 2019.

In November 2017, it was revealed that X-Factor finalists Jedward would turn on Kirkby's Christmas tree lights on 23 November 2017. This followed the success of 2016's festive events. The musical duo was joined by 90s dance-pop group N-Trance. The performances were followed by a fireworks finale as the lights were switched on. It was reported that 9000 people attended the event.
In June 2018, St Modwen reported that deals had been agreed with two major brands, Home Bargains and fast food restaurant KFC. Home Bargains were to relocate from their existing small store to occupy a larger 20,000 sq ft unit. KFC agreed a lease to a new 3,500 sq ft restaurant and with that became the first food and beverage brand to sign-up to the scheme.
In November 2018, the Kirkby Christmas lights were again turned on in a dedicated event. This year B*witched front woman, Edele Lynch, switched on the Christmas lights in the Town Centre on Thursday 22 November, performing some of B*witched's hits and a range of Christmas songs. There was a range of special guests from a variety of talent shows including, The Voice 2016 winner Kevin Simm, Ella Shaw, Mr Zip, Ryan Lawrie and Dene Michael's Black Lace. There were also performances from 2011 Britain’s Got Talent winner and musician, Jai McDowall, and 1990s band Dave Finnegan's Commitments performed.

Council intervention
Despite St Modwen's assurances of development and new building in the town, much of what was confirmed by the company failed to materialise. The town still lacked a major supermarket, and the town centre lacked new parking facilities, additionally despite being agreed in November 2016 the proposed cinema on the site of the old library has not been built.

This culminated with Knowsley council deciding to step in after developers refused to say when construction would start. Council leader Graham Morgan said in a statement reported by the Liverpool Echo "despite our best efforts, the redevelopment of the town centre still hasn't happened and it's quite clear that we need to find a different model. The people of Kirkby deserve more than this. We have worked closely to encourage St. Modwen to push on with their plans but, despite major names already being signed up, they remain extremely cautious and have still not confirmed a start date. We have waited too long and it's time to move on.”

On 19 July 2019, the Council’s Cabinet endorsed the plan for the Council to purchase St Modwen’s assets in Kirkby town centre, buying 100 properties: 87 existing shops, 10 which are going to be built, and moved forward with plans to build two drive-through restaurants, and a petrol station. As well as the deal to purchase St Modwen’s assets, the Cabinet also agreed plans to deliver a cinema and restaurants/bars scheme (on the former Kirkby Library site on Newtown Gardens) and purchase the Knowsley College site on Cherryfield Drive, the council purchasing the Cherryfield Drive site from them will enable the College to progress with their plans to relocate to new premises in the heart of the town centre.

On 29 January 2020, a ground breaking ceremony was held in Town Centre marking the council's commitment to the new redevelopment plans including a 45,000 sq ft Morrisons superstore. As of July 2022 the site also includes a petrol station, car parking, a Home Bargains, A Taco-Bell and drive-thru KFC.

Transport

The M57 motorway runs adjacent to Kirkby, and the M58 motorway connects just north of the town. Other major routes include East Lancashire Road and the A506. Kirkby railway station serves the town on the northern line and on the Kirkby branch line. Stagecoach Merseyside connects Kirkby with most of Merseyside and Greater Manchester.

Education

Primary secular, Church of England, and Roman Catholic education is available. At the secondary level, secular and Roman Catholic education is available. Educational services are provided or monitored by the Knowsley local education authority.

Kirkby has 11 primary schools; Northwood Community Primary School is the newest and largest. Kirkby High School and All Saints Catholic High School were formed after the town's three secondary schools closed. Ruffwood and Brookfield, due to merge in September 2009, merged a year early when Ruffwood was designated a failing school in an Ofsted report. After the shake-up, All Saints Catholic High School and the Kirkby Sports College Center for Learning emerged. On 1 September 2013, Kirkby Sports College became an academy and was relaunched as Kirkby High School.

Higher education is provided by Knowsley Community College, with its main campus in Kirkby Town Centre. The college has an annual intake of over 12,000.

Houses of worship

St Chad's Church, built during the 19th century on the site of a church noted in the Domesday Book, has graves of soldiers of both world wars. Other churches are St Michael's and All Angels Roman Catholic Church; St Mark's, St Andrews and St Martin's Churches (Church of England), St Mary, Mother of God and St Joseph's Roman Catholic Churches, Kirkby Baptist Church, St Peter & Paul RC Church, Northwood Chapel, Lifegate Church and the Kingdom Hall of Jehovah's Witnesses.

Sports and recreation
Kirkby is home to the training ground and youth academy of Liverpool F.C. The youth academy was built in 1998 on the site previously used for Kirkby Town F.C.'s ground located on Simonswood Lane; the plans to move Liverpool F.C.'s full training ground to the same location were announced in 2018 and the move was completed during the international break in November 2020. The town's former football club Kirkby Town, was later renamed Knowsley United and was dissolved in 1997. The most widely supported football teams in Kirkby are Liverpool F.C. and Everton F.C. reflecting the town's proximity to Liverpool and historically that a large proportion of the town's residents moved from Liverpool to the town after world war two.

Services
Law enforcement is provided by Merseyside Police, whose basic command unit in the borough of Knowsley has a Kirkby station on St Chad's Drive. Public transport is co-ordinated by Merseytravel. Fire and rescue services are provided by the Merseyside Fire and Rescue Service, which has a Kirkby station on Webster Drive.

Waste management is co-ordinated by the Merseyside Recycling and Waste Authority. Kirkby's distribution network operator for electricity is United Utilities; there are no power stations in the town. United Utilities also manages Kirkby's drinking and wastewater. SUEZ Recycling & Recovery UK process Merseyside and Halton's waste at a rail loading transfer station in Kirkby. The waste is transported from Kirkby to Wilton in Teesside where it is used to generate electricity. Power generated at Wilton is sufficient to power every home in Knowsley.

Kirkby is served by the Knowsley PCT, and Aintree University Hospital is the nearest hospital. The town has nine GP surgeries and four dental practices. Ambulance service is provided by the North West Ambulance Service, with a station in Kirkby.

BT Group's Simonswood exchange provides local telephone and ADSL Internet service to the area, with a number of other companies offering services through local-loop unbundling. Virgin Media services are also available to the town, providing television, telephone and cable Internet access.

Media
The main local newspaper is the Liverpool Echo. The Kirkby Extra and the Knowsley Challenge are free local newspapers. The local BBC radio station is Radio Merseyside, and the ITV franchisee is ITV Granada.

Filmography
Kirkby and Seaforth were the bases for the fictional Newtown of the 1960s BBC TV series, Z-Cars.

Behind the Rent Strike is a 1974 documentary by Nick Broomfield documenting a 14-month rent strike in Kirkby by 3,000 social housing tenants protesting poor housing and rent increases triggered by the Housing Finance Act of 1972.

The 1985 film Letter to Brezhnev was shot in Liverpool, with scenes filmed in Kirkby. The film starred Margi Clarke, who was born in the town.

Notable people

Footballers 
Dennis Mortimer - Captained Aston Villa to the 1982 European Cup final
Mike Marsh - Former Liverpool and Southend United player, Liverpool coach, and national under-17 coach 
Leighton Baines – Everton player, formerly of Wigan Athletic
Aaron McGowan - Kilmarnock F.C. player
Jamie Jones – Wigan Athletic player
Phil Boersma – Former Liverpool player
Tommy Caton – former Manchester City, Arsenal, and Oxford United player
Paul Cook – Former Wigan Athletic manager and former Wigan Athletic and Tranmere Rovers player
Alan Dugdale – Former Coventry City, Charlton Athletic and Barnsley player
Ken Dugdale – Former Wigan Athletic player and New Zealand national team manager
Alan Stubbs – Former Bolton Wanderers, Everton and Celtic player, and current Rotherham United manager
Terry McDermott – Former Liverpool and Newcastle United player
Phil Thompson – Captain of Liverpool F.C. in the 1981 European Cup Final. 
Rickie Lambert - Former West Bromwich Albion and Liverpool player
Craig Noone - Cardiff City F.C. player
Phil Edwards - Burton Albion F.C. player, former Accrington Stanley F.C. player
Jimmy Redfern - Former Bolton Wanderers F.C. and Chester City F.C. player
Gary Bennett - Former Kirkby Town, Skelmersdale United F.C., Wigan Athletic, Chester City F.C., Wrexham A.F.C., Tranmere Rovers F.C. and Preston North End F.C. player
George Donnelly - Former Tranmere Rovers player
Michelle Hinnigan - Former Everton L.F.C. player
Steve Torpey - Former Prescot Cables F.C., F.C. United of Manchester AFC Telford United, and Fleetwood Town F.C. player. Scored F.C. United of Manchester's first goal in a friendly match against Flixton F.C.
Mark Hughes - Accrington Stanley F.C. player, former Everton player
John Coleman - Accrington Stanley manager
Ryan Taylor - Former Newcastle United F.C. player
Connor Randall Former Liverpool player, current Ross County F.C. player
Danny CoidFormer Blackpool F.C. player

Other sports figures 
John Conteh - 1970 Commonwealth Games middleweight boxing gold medalist, former WBC light heavyweight champion
Paul Hodkinson - Former WBC featherweight boxing champion
Joey "The Jab" Singleton - British champion boxer

Others

 Robert Atherton – poet
Peter Augustine Baines - Benedictine, titular bishop of Siga and Vicar Apostolic of the Western District of England
Alan Bleasdale – playwright
Aiden Byrne – youngest Michelin Award chef
China Crisis – pop/rock band
Margi Clarke – actress
Craig Colton – finalist on The X Factor 2011
Stephen Graham – actor
 Tony Jones – bass player in The Christians
Tony Maudsley – actor
Sharon Maughan – actress
Tricia Penrose – actress
Steve Rotheram - Mayor of the Liverpool City Region
Andrew Schofield – actor
James Bulger - murder victim

See also
Listed buildings in Kirkby

References

External links

 Liverpool Street Gallery – Liverpool 33
Knowsley Local History – Kirkby 
Historical images of Kirkby 
St. Chad's Church website
Kirkby Christian Fellowship's website
St Kevin's Kirkby website
Kirkby Baptist Church's website
Kirkby High School's website

Towns in Merseyside
Towns and villages in the Metropolitan Borough of Knowsley
Unparished areas in Merseyside